Harvey M. Haakenson is a retired brigadier general in the National Guard of the United States and former Deputy Adjutant General of the North Dakota Army National Guard.

Career
Haakenson first enlisted in the North Dakota Army National Guard in 1985. He was commissioned an officer in 1964. His retirement was effective as of June 26, 2000.

Awards he received include the Meritorious Service Medal with oak leaf cluster, the Army Commendation Medal, the Army Reserve Components Achievement Medal with three oak leaf clusters, the National Defense Service Medal with service star, the Armed Forces Reserve Medal, the Army Service Ribbon, and the Army Reserve Components Overseas Training Ribbon with award numeral 2.

Education
University of North Dakota
University of Wisconsin-Stout

References

United States Army generals
University of North Dakota alumni
University of Wisconsin–Stout alumni
Living people
Year of birth missing (living people)